The Vietnam Association of Athletics Federations is the national governing body for the sport of athletics in Vietnam.

Presidents 
Tạ Quang Bửu 
Phạm Song 
Trương Mộc Lâm 
Tạ Quang Ngọc 
Lê Dương Quang (2009 - 2013)
Hoàng Vệ Dũng (2014- 2023)

External links 
Official website

Vietnam
Federation
Athletics Federations
National governing bodies for athletics
Sports organizations established in 1962